Imogen Gay Poots (born 3 June 1989) is an English actress and model. She played Tammy in the post-apocalyptic horror film 28 Weeks Later (2007), Linda Keith in the Jimi Hendrix biopic Jimi: All Is by My Side (2013), Debbie Raymond in the Paul Raymond biopic The Look of Love (2013), and Julia Maddon in the American action film Need for Speed (2014). Also in 2014, she portrayed Jesse Crichton in A Long Way Down, alongside Pierce Brosnan and Aaron Paul. In 2016, she starred as Kelly Ann in the Showtime series Roadies. In 2020, she played Laura in the Academy Award winning The Father (2020), which starred Anthony Hopkins and Olivia Colman.

Early life 
Poots was born at the Queen Charlotte's and Chelsea Hospital in Hammersmith, London, the daughter of Trevor Poots, a current affairs television producer from Belfast, and Fiona Goodall, a journalist and voluntary worker from Bolton. She has an older brother, Alex, who is a model.

Raised in Chiswick, West London, Poots was privately educated, attending Bute House Preparatory School for Girls in Brook Green, Queen's Gate School in South Kensington, and Latymer Upper School in Hammersmith. While intending to become a veterinary surgeon, she began spending Saturdays at an improvisation workshop hosted by the Young Blood Theatre Company at the Riverside Studios in Hammersmith. She abandoned her original career aspiration after fainting at the sight of veterinary surgery during work experience. Attaining three A grades at A-level, she won a place at the Courtauld Institute of Art in 2008, but had it deferred for two years in order to pursue her acting career.

Career 

Poots first appeared on-screen in a 2004 episode of Casualty and had a non-speaking role in 2005 in V for Vendetta, but she was largely unknown when, at the age of 17, Juan Carlos Fresnadillo cast her in the horror film 28 Weeks Later, released in 2007. Since then, she has appeared in films such as Cracks in 2009, Centurion in 2010, and as the female lead in the 2011 remake of Fright Night alongside Anton Yelchin. Although Poots has never formally trained as an actress, according to Giles Hattersley, she developed her acting skills through a practical apprenticeship that may have served her well, as she is "compellingly natural" in front of the camera.

In 2011, she was chosen by fashion house Chloé to appear in a campaign for its eponymous fragrance shot by Inez van Lamsweerde and Vinoodh Matadin. In 2012, she was selected to star in a Sofia Coppola-directed advertising campaign for a collaboration between fashion label Marni and high street retailer H&M.

In 2012, Poots played the acrimonious young violinist Alexandra Gelbart opposite Catherine Keener and Philip Seymour Hoffman in A Late Quartet. In 2013, she appeared in Greetings from Tim Buckley, Filth, The Look of Love, and portrayed Linda Keith in the Jimi Hendrix biopic Jimi: All Is by My Side, alongside André Benjamin as Hendrix. In 2014, Poots starred in the romantic comedy That Awkward Moment and action film Need for Speed, an adaptation of the video game series, and played Jess in the black comedy A Long Way Down. In 2015, she appeared in She's Funny That Way with Jennifer Aniston and Knight of Cups with Cate Blanchett, has been cast in the adaptation of Jess Walter's novel Beautiful Ruins, and reunited with Yelchin for Green Room. In 2016, she starred as Kelly Ann in the Showtime series Roadies.

In 2017, she played Honey in Who's Afraid of Virginia Woolf?, which was broadcast via National Theatre Live on 18 May 2017 from the Harold Pinter Theatre in the London West End. Also that year, Poots starred in the Amy Herzog play Belleville at the Donmar Warehouse opposite James Norton.

Personal life 
Poots has been in a relationship with actor James Norton since 2018. They are engaged as of 2022.

Filmography

Film

Television

Stage

Awards and nominations

References

External links 

 

1989 births
21st-century English actresses
Actresses from London
Alumni of the Courtauld Institute of Art
British people of Northern Ireland descent
British people of Scottish descent
English child actresses
English female models
English film actresses
English people of Northern Ireland descent
English television actresses
Living people
People educated at Latymer Upper School
People educated at Queen's Gate School
People from Chiswick
People from Hammersmith
English stage actresses
English voice actresses